Maigaoqiao station, located in the city of Nanjing, is an aboveground station of Line 1 of the Nanjing Metro, and is the current northern terminus of the line.

Physical Dimension 
Maigaoqiao station is in the north-south direction with a length of 213.189 meters, a width of 19.3 meters, and a height of 16.5 meters. Its total area is 4909 square meters with five exits in total.

Surroundings 
Surroundings include a park called Swallow Rock, schools, hospitals, and other institutions. Schools nearby are Maigaoqiao Elementary School, ChengXian Street Elementary School, and College of Education in Nanjing University of Aeronautics and Astronautics. Hospitals consist of Integrated Chinese and Western Hospital of Jiangsu Province. There are government and public institutions around the station as well.

Notes

References

Railway stations in Jiangsu
Railway stations in China opened in 2005
Nanjing Metro stations